David Connolly (born 11 June 1980) is an Irish skeleton racer who competed from 2002 to 2006. He finished 20th in the men's skeleton event at the 2006 Winter Olympics in Turin.

References
 2006 men's skeleton results
 FIBT profile
 Skeletonsport.com profile

External links
 

1980 births
Irish male skeleton racers
Living people
Skeleton racers at the 2006 Winter Olympics
Olympic skeleton racers of Ireland